HMS Woodcock was built by Fairfields at Govan; laid down on 21 October 1941, launched on 26 November 1942, and completed 29 May 1943. She was the fifth Royal Naval vessel to carry this name.

Construction and career
She then moved to the Channel in May 1944, intending to take part in the Normandy landings. However she collided with the destroyer , on 27 May 1944 and repairs took until December 1944.

The work included changes to fit her for service in the Pacific and she joined the Pacific Fleet at Manus 5 March 1945. She was present in Tokyo Bay on Victory over Japan Day (2 September 1945) when the Japanese Instrument of Surrender was signed on board the battleship .

Remained in the Pacific until late 1946 when she returned to the UK to be put into reserve at West Hartlepool. She was sold for breaking up in November 1955 and was scrapped at Rosyth.

See also
 Black Swan-class

References

Further reading 
 
 
 
 
 

 

Black Swan-class sloops
World War II sloops of the United Kingdom
1942 ships